Trail of Stars is the ninth studio album by American alternative country band The Walkabouts released on August 2, 1999 through Glitterhouse Records. It's their return album to Glitterhouse, formerly Sub Pop Europe, after a two album detour with major label Virgin.

Track listing
All tracks written by Chris Eckman, except where noted.

 "Desert Skies" (Eckman, Carla Torgerson, strings arrangement by Glenn Slater) – 7:32
 "Straight to the Stars" – 4:32
 "Gold" – 6:26
 "Last Tears" – 6:21
 "Crime Story" – 4:39
 "Hightimes" (strings arrangement by Fred Chalenor) – 4:53
 "Harvey's Quote to Me" (Slater) – 1:29
 "On the Day" (Eckman, Chalenor, woodwinds arrangement by Chalenor) – 6:30
 "Till I Reach You" – 4:37
 "Drown" – 4:30
 "No One the Wiser" (strings arrangement by Slater) – 6:43

 limited edition
 "Bonnie and Clyde" (Serge Gainsbourg) – 6:27
The limited edition also contained a multimedia track with a screen saver.

The album was engineered and mixed at Paradise Sound, Index, Washington and Avast!, Seattle, Washington and Swanyard, London. The album was mastered at Country Masters, Surrey.

Release history

Drown (Single)

Drown is the eleventh single by American alternative country band The Walkabouts released on August 23, 1999 through Glitterhouse Records. The catalog number is GR 461.

 Track listing
 "Drown (Stars on 45 edit)"
 "Bonnie and Clyde" (Serge Gainsbourg)
 "Lost in the Scraps"

The song "Bonnie and Clyde" was also released as a bonus track of the limited editions (both LP and CD) of Trail of Stars.

Personnel 

 Fred Chalenor – bass
 Terri Moeller – drums, percussion, loops
 Glenn Slater – organ, Fender Rhodes, piano, ARP synthesizer, Moog synthesizer, mellotron, tapes
 Carla Torgerson – vocals, electric guitar, acoustic guitar, percussion, tapes
 Chris Eckman – vocals, electric guitar, acoustic guitar, piano, wobble board, samples, loops

 Additional musicians

 Steve Moore – trombone
 Christine Gunn – solo cello
 Bev Setzer – clarinet
 Kevin Suggs – pedel steel
 April Acevez Cameron – viola
 Justine Foy – cello
 Tyler A. Reilly – violin
 Rebecca Clemens-Keith – violin
 Phill Brown – loops, sounds

 Technical personnel

 Phill Brown – production, mixing
 Kevin Suggs – additional engineering
 Pat Sample – assistant engineer
 Kip Beelman – assistant engineer
 Jason Howes – assistant engineer
 Dennis Blackham – mastering

 Additional personnel

 Maurizio Poletto – design
 Enrico Bravi – design
 Mark Van S. – band photographs
 David French – space-ship sculptures

Critical reception

John Duffy wrote for Allmusic: "... Drenched in John Cale-like soundscape washes and heavy strings, Trail of Stars comes off as morose and dirge-like. Only "Straight to the Stars" doesn't feel like a death march. This is frustrating, since the instrumentation of the record is expertly crafted and lovingly played. ..."

Don Jates wrote for KEXP-FM: "The veteran Seattle band continues to evolve with this album of dark, delicately textured atmospheric pop."

Gaesteliste compared it to Portishead, Massive Attack, and Roxy Music.

Charts
The album charted one week (36/1999) on position 30 of the Norwegian album charts.

References

1999 albums
The Walkabouts albums